Soisalo is an area in central Finland, south of Kuopio. It is commonly regarded as the largest island of Finland. Whilst it is an area of land surrounded by water (the lakes Kallavesi, Unnukka, Suvasvesi and Kermajärvi), as the lakes are narrow in places they are more like rivers, there is an argument that it is not a true island.

References

Lake islands of Finland